The equestrian events at the 1920 Summer Olympics in Antwerp included eventing, show jumping, vaulting and dressage. The competitions were held from 6 to 12 September 1920. Although there were 89 riders competing, many rode in more than one event, with 87 entries total (45 jumping, 17 dressage, 25 eventing). Vaulting was also held, its one appearance at an Olympic Games, with only Belgium, France and Sweden fielding teams.

Disciplines

Dressage
The requirements for the dressage test remained the same as for the 1912 Games. Team dressage medals were not distributed.

Show jumping
The show jumping competition held both its individual and team competitions on the same day, and riders in the team event could not compete for an individual medal. Therefore, 10 riders total (5 team and 5 individual) could be sent for the jumping competition, although only Italy and Sweden were able to field that many riders.

Eventing
The cross-country test proved to be challenging, with 12 of the 25 horses contesting the course finishing with time faults, and 13 finishing with faults at obstacles.

Medal summary

Participating nations
A total of 89 riders from 8 nations competed at the Antwerp Games:

Medal table

Footnotes

References
 

 
1920 Summer Olympics events
1920